The Hinton Parklander was a weekly newspaper serving the Hinton, Alberta area. On January 8, 2020, Postmedia announced the paper would cease publication on January 13, 2020.

See also
List of newspapers in Canada

References

External links
Hinton Parklander

Defunct newspapers published in Alberta
Weekly newspapers published in Alberta
Hinton, Alberta
Newspapers established in 1955
Publications disestablished in 2020